Tuvalu consists of nine separate islands: six atolls and three reef islands. An atoll typically consists of several islets: Tuvalu has a total of 124 islands and islets. Each island is surrounded by a coral reef. Tuvalu's small, widely scattered atolls have poor soil and a total land area of only about  making Tuvalu the fourth-smallest country in the world. The sea level at the Funafuti tide gauge has been rising at a rate of 3.9 mm per year, and it has been determined that rising sea levels are causing more wave energy to be transferred across reef surfaces, which has tended to push more sand onto island shorelines, increasing islands’ land area. Over a recent four-decade period, there was a net increase in the land area of the islets of 2.9% (73.5 ha), although the changes were not uniform: About 74% of them increased in size and about 27% decreased in size.

Islands of Tuvalu
The islands of Tuvalu are spread out between the latitude of 5° to 10° south and longitude of 176° to 180°, west of the International Date Line.

The name, Tuvalu, means "eight standing together" in Tuvaluan.

The reef islands have a different structure to the atolls, and are perhaps better described as “reef platforms,” as they are small, tabular platforms that lack the salt-water lagoon typically found on reef islands. The reef platforms do have a completely enclosed rim of dry land, and the rim surrounds the remnants of a lagoon, but these lagoon remnants have no connection to the open sea, and tend to dry up as coral debris accumulates in them over time. For example, Niutao has two brackish, saline lakes which are the degraded remnants of an ancient lagoon.

The smallest island, Niulakita, which is the ninth island in the Tuvaluan archipelago, has not been continuously inhabited. It has been privately owned since 1944, when the Gilbert and Ellice Islands Colony administration purchased the island and granted people from Vaitupu permission to settle there. However, in 1949, a successor administration made the controversial decision to expel the Vaitupuans from Niulakita, and arrange for residents of Niutao to settle there instead, because Niutao was felt to be overpopulated. Niulakita is a separate local government district, but it is administered as part of Niutao, and is represented in the Parliament of Tuvalu by members of the constituency of Niutao.

At least 11 islands are inhabited, expanded over the biggest isles of the nine atolls, plus two islands in Funafuti. Tuvalu has ISO 3166-2 codes defined for 1 town council (Funafuti) and 7 island councils. Niulakita, which now has its own island council, is not listed as it is administered as part of Niutao.

Royal Society of London investigation of the formation of coral reefs at Funafuti

An expedition (Funafuti Coral Reef Boring Expedition of the Royal Society) under Professor William Sollas of Oxford University, conducted by the Royal Society of London carried out drilling on the coral reef at Funafuti in 1896, 1897 and 1898.

HMS Penguin, under the command of Captain Arthur Mostyn Field, delivered the 1896 expedition to Funafuti  in the Ellice Islands, arriving on 21 May 1896, and returned to Sydney on 22 August 1896. From 1896 to 1899 the Penguin was under the command of Captain Arthur Mostyn Field and her surveying work included further voyages to Funafuti atoll to deliver the expeditions of the Royal Society in 1897 and 1898. The surveys carried out by the Penguin resulted in the preparation of the Admiralty Nautical Chart 2983 for the islands.

The Royal Society of London were investigating the formation of coral reefs and whether traces of shallow-water organisms could be found at depth in the coral of Pacific atolls. Three expeditions used drilling equipment to take core samples of the coral reef. The boreholes on Fongafale islet are at the site now called Darwin's Drill, A goal of the expeditions was to drill down to confirm that the coral material was located on a base of volcanic rock. This investigation followed the work on the structure and distribution of coral reefs conducted by  Charles Darwin in the Pacific. However, the geologic history of atolls is more complex than Darwin (1842) and Davis (1928) envisioned.

First expedition (1896)
The expedition was led by Professor William Johnson Sollas of the University of Oxford and included Professor Edgeworth David and Walter George Woolnough of the University of Sydney.

Second expedition (1897)
The expedition was led by Professor Edgeworth David of the University of Sydney (that included George Sweet as second-in-command, and Walter George Woolnough).

Third expedition (1898)
The expedition was led by Alfred Edmund Finckh of the University of Sydney.

Results of the Royal Society expeditions
The purpose of the expedition was to attempt to settle the question as to the formation of coral atolls. The first expedition experienced defects in the boring machinery and the bore penetrated only slightly more than 100 feet (approx. 31 m). The second expedition reached a depth of 557 feet (170 m). The third expedition was successful in carrying the bore to 1,114 feet (340 m). The results provided support for Charles Darwin's theory of subsidence; in which there are four stages in development of coral reefs: a volcanic island forms, is surrounded by a fringing coral reef, as it subsides slowly a wide barrier reef forms, then after it has sunk below sea level the coral continues to grow forming a circular atoll. However, the geologic history of atolls is more complex than Darwin (1842) and Davis (1920 & 1928) envisioned.

Structure of Funafuti atoll

The average depth in the Funafuti lagoon (Te Namo) is about 20 fathoms  (36.5 metres or 120 feet).

See also
 ISO 3166-2:TV
 List of mammals of Tuvalu
 List of birds of Tuvalu
 List of butterflies of Tuvalu
 Funafuti Conservation Area
 Geography of Tuvalu

References

 
 
Subdivisions of Tuvalu
Tuvalu, Islands
Tuvalu 1
Tuvalu
Tuvalu-related lists